Winston Tion-sin Dang (born 1943) is a Taiwanese politician and member of the Democratic Progressive Party. He was elected to the Legislative Yuan in 2004, and served through 2007, when he was appointed leader of the  Environmental Protection Administration. He stepped down from the agency in 2008.

Education
Dang did his undergraduate education at Taipei Medical University, earning a B.A. in Pharmacology. He then moved to the United States to pursue further education, successively earning an M.A. Research from 
Columbia University's 
School of Pharmacology, a Ph.D. in Biochemistry from the City University of New York, and a M.P.H. from the Harvard School of Public Health.

Career
Dang worked for the United States Environmental Protection Agency, prior to his return to Taiwan and election to the Legislative Yuan as a Democratic Progressive Party representative of overseas Chinese.

Dang was appointed head of the Environmental Protection Administration by Chen Shui-bian after the 2004 elections, and Dang renounced his U.S. citizenship to take up the position. His work as minister earned him the nickname "the over-educated garbage man". He served in the position until 2008, when he was succeeded by Stephen Shen.

References

1943 births
Living people
Columbia University College of Pharmacy alumni
Graduate Center, CUNY alumni
Democratic Progressive Party Members of the Legislative Yuan
Taiwanese Ministers of Environment
Harvard School of Public Health alumni
People who renounced United States citizenship
Taiwanese emigrants to the United States
Taipei Medical University alumni
People of the United States Environmental Protection Agency
Taiwanese environmentalists
American emigrants to Taiwan
Members of the 6th Legislative Yuan
Party List Members of the Legislative Yuan